The People's Coalition, officially the People's Coalition of Political Parties and Public Associations "For the Reforms of Tokayev", is a political coalition in Kazakhstan formed on 6 October 2022 from various pro-government political parties and republican public associations in support of incumbent President Kassym-Jomart Tokayev's reelection bid for the 2022 presidential election.

History 
On 6 October 2022, the ruling Amanat party chairman Erlan Qoşanov announced the creation of a People's Coalition to support Kassym-Jomart Tokayev in the 2022 snap presidential elections. Political scientists expressed the opinion that the Amanat party would become the core of the coalition.

On the same day, a forum of the People's Coalition was held in Astana, in which representatives of the Amanat, the People's Party and the Aq Jol parties took part. All three parties put forward Tokayev's candidacy for the presidency.

On 7 October, the coalition submitted documents to the CEC for the registration of Tokayev. In particular, the package of documents required for registration was provided by the Amanat Party, the People's Party, the Ak Zhol, the Organization of Veterans, QAZAQSTAN TEAM, the Association of Maslikhat Deputies of Kazakhstan, the Council of Generals, and the Kazakhstan Union of Athletes.

Composition 
The coalition includes three political parties and more than 30 republican public associations.

 Amanat
 Aq Jol Democratic Party
 People's Party of Kazakhstan
 National Volunteer Network
 Civil Alliance of Kazakhstan
 Qazaqstan Team Youth Association
 Veterans Organization
 Kazakhstan Union of Athletes
 Association of Deputies of Mäslihats of Kazakhstan
 Council of Generals
 "Kazakhstan Ardagerleri" Association
 and others

References 

Political parties established in 2022
Political parties in Kazakhstan
Political party alliances in Kazakhstan
2022 establishments in Kazakhstan